Roller sports competitions at the 2011 Pan American Games in Guadalajara  were held from October 23 to October 27 at the Pan American Skating Track.

Medal summary

Medal table

Men's events
Speed

Artistic

Women's events
Speed

Artistic

Schedule
All times are Central Daylight Time (UTC-5).

Qualification
The qualification tournament was the 2011 Pan American Championship between March 8 and 13, 2011 in Rosario, Argentina.

Qualification summary

References

 
Events at the 2011 Pan American Games
2011